The 1902 Baylor football team was an American football team that represented Baylor University as an independent during the 1902 college football season. In its first season under head coach J. C. Ewing, the team compiled a 3–4–2 record.

This was Baylor's first losing season. The Thanksgiving game was played at the Lee canal athletic grounds.

Schedule

References

Baylor
Baylor Bears football seasons
Baylor football